ν Chamaeleontis, Latinized as Nu Chamaeleontis, is a single star in the southern circumpolar constellation of Chamaeleon. It is a yellow-hued star, dimly visible to the naked eye, with an apparent visual magnitude of 5.43. This object is located at a distance of 189 light-years from the Sun, based on its parallax, and is drifting further away with a radial velocity of +11 km/s. It has an absolute magnitude of 1.59.

This object is an aging G-type giant star with a stellar classification of G8III. Having exhausted the supply of hydrogen at its core, it has expanded and cooled off the main sequence; at present it has 6.5 times the girth of the Sun. The star has 1.6 times the mass of the Sun and is radiating 24 times the Sun's luminosity from its swollen photosphere at an effective temperature of 5008 K. These coordinates are a source for X-ray emission, which is most likely (99.3% chance) coming from the star.

References

G-type giants
Chamaeleon (constellation)
Chamaeleontis, Nu
Durchmusterung objects
085396
047956
3902